Santo vs The Clones is a 2004 Cartoon Network Latin American original animated series consisting of five short episodes, which were aired every Wednesday nights at 8:00 PM in Mexico, and also in another Latin American countries. It's created by Carlo Olivares Paganoni, a filmmaker and advertising worker, but also a cartoonist who already made the local Cartoon Network pilot Bobots; he wanted to pay tribute to the legendary defunct Luchador wrestler enmascarado and film actor Rodolfo Guzmán Huerta, better known as El Santo. Finally, Carlo hired for this show as developer El Hijo del Santo.

Synopsis
Set in Mexico City, Santo vs The Clones follows the adventures of the homonym wrestler as a superhero who must try to stop the plans of Dr. Clone, an evil scientist, who which is determined to kill him and simultaneously dominate the world by creating clones of his old enemies (through their DNA).

Voice cast

 Daniel Giménez Cacho – Dr. Clone
 Omar Chaparro – Adenaido
 Jimmy Guthrie – Frankus
 Gabriela Guzmán – Diana
 Flavio Medina – Adrián
 Alberto Pedrel – Santo
 Arturo Rivera – The Announcer
 Héctor Sáez – The Professor
 Julio Vega – Jardinero
 Gabriela Willert – Chiquis

Episodes

Canceled U.S. show
Like a relation to Santo vs The Clones, in 2007 has been announced that its international version is in development at Cartoon Network Studios, but was eventually released as an unaired short pilot titled Mask of Santo in 2008. Also for it, Carlo Olivares Paganoni and El Hijo del Santo are reconfirmed as creator and developer, respectively.

References

External links
 Santo Contra Los Clones at FilmAffinity

2000s Mexican television series
2000s animated television series
International Cartoon Network original programming
Mexican children's animated action television series
Mexican children's animated adventure television series
Mexican children's animated horror television series
Mexican children's animated science fiction television series
Television series about cloning
2004 Mexican television series debuts
2004 Mexican television series endings
Animation based on real people
Cultural depictions of El Santo